Hugo Josefsson is a Swedish philatelist who in 1986 won the Grand Prix National at the STOCKHOLMIA 86 international stamp exhibition. In 1990 he was awarded the Strandell Medal by the Scandinavian Collectors Club. He is a specialist in the nineteenth century stamps of Sweden.

References 

Living people
Swedish philatelists
Year of birth missing (living people)
Philately of Sweden